Denha I was the Grand Metropolitan of the East and head of the Syriac Orthodox Church of the East from 649 until his death in 659. He is commemorated as a saint by the Syriac Orthodox Church in the Martyrology of Rabban Sliba, and his feast day is 2 October.

Biography
Denha became a monk at the monastery of Saint Matthew near Mosul and studied under Marutha, who would later ascend to the office of Grand Metropolitan of the East, the highest-ranking prelate amongst the miaphysite bishops in the former Sasanian Empire. After Marutha's death on 2 May 649 (AG 960), Denha was chosen to succeed him and was thus brought before the Patriarch Theodore and ordained as archbishop of Tikrit and Grand Metropolitan of the East. It was formerly asserted by the French orientalist Rubens Duval that Denha was the first miaphysite Grand Metropolitan of the East to hold the title maphrian, however, it was likely not in use until . He served until his death on 3 November 659 (AG 970) and he was buried with Marutha at the cathedral in the citadel of Tikrit.

Works
Denha wrote a hagiography of Marutha (Brit. Mus. MS. 14645), which was later translated by the French Syriacist François Nau.

References

Bibliography

Syriac Orthodox Church saints
Year of birth unknown
Syriac writers
Maphrians
7th-century Oriental Orthodox archbishops
659 deaths
Christians of the Rashidun Caliphate
7th-century Syriac Orthodox Church bishops
7th-century writers
Writers of the medieval Islamic world
Mesopotamian saints